was a Japanese actor and singer born in Kobe. His elder brother is Shintaro Ishihara, an author, politician, and the Governor of Tokyo between 1999 and 2012. Yujiro's film debut was the 1956 film Season of the Sun, based on a novel written by his brother. He was beloved by many fans as a representative youth star in the films of postwar Japan and subsequently as a macho movie hero. He was extravagantly mourned following his early death from liver cancer.

Life and career
Yūjirō grew up in Kobe, in Otaru, Hokkaidō, and in Zushi, Kanagawa. His father, an employee of Mitsui O.S.K. Lines, was from Ehime Prefecture, and his mother was from Miyajima, Hiroshima.
Yūjirō attended Otaru Fuji Kindergarten and then Otaru City Inaho Elementary School. During his elementary school years he participated in competitive swimming and skied on Mt. Tengu. He then attended Zushi City Zushi junior High School, where he began playing basketball. He aimed to enter Keio Senior High School, but did not pass the entrance examination. He enrolled at Keio Shiki Boys' Senior High School, but in 1951 was admitted to Keio Senior High School. Afterward he entered the political science department of the school of law at Keio University, associated with the high school, but reportedly spent all his time playing around.

Wanting to become an actor, he auditioned at Toho, Daiei Film and Nikkatsu, but did not pass any of his auditions. However, in 1956, with help from producer Takiko Mizunoe and his brother Shintaro, he received a bit-part in the film adaptation of Shintaro's Akutagawa Prize-winning Season of the Sun, making his film debut. Afterwards he withdrew from Keio University to work for Nikkatsu, playing the lead in the film adaptation of Shintaro's novel Crazed Fruit.

At the 1958 Blue Ribbon Awards Ishihara won the prize for best new actor for the 1957 films Washi to taka and Man Who Causes a Storm. He would go on to become one of the representative stars of the Showa Era with his twin acting and singing career, but his life was one made harder by illness and injury.

In 1960 he married actress Mie Kitahara, his co-star in a number of films beginning in 1956 with Crazed Fruit.

Yūjirō, together with Akira Kobayashi, was the main male star at Nikkatsu on Nikkatsu's move into the Roman Porno soft porn market. Yūjirō founded the Ishihara Productions company to make films. Kurobe's Sun which he produced was a great success but some movies he produced failed and he was forced to appear in the television dramas although he was reluctant to appear.

Yūjirō survived a 1978 oral cancer of the tongue, and a 1981 aortic aneurysm, supported by friends, family and his legion of fans. However he was later diagnosed with liver cancer and died at Keio University Hospital in 1987 on July 17 at 4:26. He was 52 years old. His final appearance as an actor was in the final episode of popular detective television drama Taiyō ni Hoero!. In Taiyō ni Hoero! Ishihara kept on playing the role of Shunsuke Todō for 14 years and gained new popularity.

Throughout his life Yūjirō used alcohol and tobacco, and ate meals that were lacking in vegetables; this unhealthy lifestyle is generally acknowledged as contributing to his early death.

Legacy and memorials
Yujiro Ishihara was called a Japanese Elvis Presley and his films and music are still followed by lovers of the Shōwa period. On the anniversary of his death, 17 July, his mourning ceremony is often rebroadcast on television.

His grave is a granite gorintō, at Sōji-ji temple in Tsurumi, Yokohama, Kanagawa. A memorial museum opened on June 21, 1991, in Otaru, Hokkaido.

In 1996 his older brother, Shintaro, published a biography, Otōto (弟), (Younger Brother), that won the Mainichi Bungakusho Special Prize and became the basis of a drama broadcast by TV Asahi in 2004.

His image features on a 1997 Japanese postage stamp.

Selected filmography

 Gesshoku (1956)
 Season of the Sun (太陽の季節, Taiyō no Kisetsu, 1956) - Mr. Izu (supporting role)
 Crazed Fruit (狂った果実, Kurutta kajitsu, 1956) - Takishima Natsuhisa
 The Baby Carriage (乳母車, Ubaguruma, 1956) - Muneo Aizawa
 Chitei no Uta (地底の歌, 1956) - Fuyu, the Diamond
 Ningen gyorai shutsugekisu (1956)
 Jazz musume tanjō (ジャズ娘誕生 Jazu musume tanjō, 1957) - Haruo Nanjô
 This Day's Life (今日のいのち Kyo no inochi, 1957)
 Sun in the Last Days of the Shogunate　(幕末太陽伝 Bakumatsu taiyōden, 1957) - Takasugi Shinsaku
 Washi to taka (1957) - Senkichi
 I Am Waiting (俺は待ってるぜ Ore wa matteru ze, 1957) - Jôji Shimaki
 Man Who Causes a Storm (嵐を呼ぶ男 Arashi o yobu otoko, aka A Storming Drummer, 1957) - Shoichi Kokubu
 Shorisha (1957)
 Subarashiki dansei (1958)
 Yoru no kiba (literally "Fang of the Night") (1958) - Kenkichi Sugiura
 Rusty Knife (錆びたナイフ Sabita naifu, 1958) - Yukihiko Tachibana
 A Slope in the Sun (陽のあたる坂道 Hi no ataru sakamichi, 1958) - Shinji Tashiro
 Fūsoku 40 metres (風速４０米 Fūsoku yonjū mētoru, 1958)
 Red Quay (赤い波止場 Akai Hatoba, 1958) - Jirô Tominaga
 Kurenai no tsubasa (1958)
 Ashita wa Ashita no Kaze ga Fuku (1958)
 Arashi no naka o tsuppashire (1958)
 Wakai Kawa no Nagare (1959) - Kensuke Sone
 Sekai o kakeru Koi (1959) - Yûji Muraoka
 Tôgyû ni kakeru otoko (1960) - Tôu Kitami
 Aitsu to watashi (1961) - Saburo Kurokawa
 Dôdôtaru jinsei (1961) - Shûhei Nakabe
 Arabu no Arashi (1961) - Shintaro Munakata
 Ginza no koi no Monogatari (1962) - Jirô Ban
 Nikui An-chikushô (1962) - Daisaku Kita
 Zerosen Kurokumo Ikka (1962)
 Wakai Hito (1962) - Shintarô Masaki
 Hana to Ryu (1962)
 Alone on the Pacific aka Alone Across the Pacific (太平洋ひとりぼっち Taiheiyo hitori-botchi, 1963) - The Youth
 Red Handkerchief (1964)
 Tekkaba Yaburi (1964)
 Kuroi Kaikyo (1964) - Akio Maki
 Taking The Castle (1965) - Tozo Kuruma
 Those Magnificent Men in Their Flying Machines (1965) - Yamamoto
 Seishun to wa nanda (1965) - Kensuke Nonomura
 Nakaseruze (1965)
 Yogiri yo Kon'yamo Arigatō (1967) - Tôru Sagara
 Hatoba no taka (1967) - Keinichi Kusumi
 Kimi wa koibito (1967) - Ishizaki - director
 Kurobe's Sun (黒部の太陽; Kurobe no Taiyō, 1968) - Iwaoka
 Wasureru Monoka (1968)
 Samurai Banners (風林火山; Fūrin Kazan, 1969) - Kenshin Uesugi
 Eiko e no 5,000 kiro (1969)
 Hitokiri (1969) - Ryoma Sakamoto
 Arashi no yushatachi (1969) - Shimaji
 Fuji sanchō (1970) - Gorō Umehara
 Machibuse (1970) - Yataro
 Aru heishi no kake (1970) - Hiroshi Kitabayashi
 Men and War (1970) - Shinozaki
 A Man′s World (1971) - Tadao Konno
 Yomigaeru daichi (1971) - Kazuya uematsu
 Kage Gari Hoero taiho (1972) - Jubei Muroto
 Kage Gari (1972) - Jubei Muroto 
 Tōga (1978) - (Special appearance)
 Arcadia of My Youth (わが青春のアルカディア Waga Seishun no Arcadia, 1982) - Phantom F. Harlock I (voice) (final film role)

TV drama
 Taiyō ni Hoero! (太陽にほえろ!) (1972-1986) - Shunsuke Tōdō (Boss)
 Daitokai Series (大都会) (1976-1978) - Gōro Munakata / Ryuta Takigawa
 Haguregumo (浮浪雲) (1978)
 Seibu Keisatsu (西部警察) (1979–84) - Kogure

Discography

Hit songs
 Arashi wo Yobu Otoko (1958)
 Ginza no Koi no Monogatari (銀座の恋の物語) (1961)
 Red handkerchief (1962)
 Futari no Sekai (1965)
 Yogiri yo Konyamo Arigatou (1967)
 Brandy Glass (ブランデー グラス) (1977)
 Waga Jinsei ni Kuiwanai (1987)
 Kita no Tabibito (1987)

References

External links

 
 Yujiro Memorial Hall's website  — Yujiro Ishihara Memorial Hall in Otaru, Hokkaido
 Japan Mint: 50th Anniversary of Yujiro Ishihara's Film Debut 2006 Proof Coin Set
 
 http://shishido0.tripod.com/ishihara.html

1934 births
1987 deaths
People from Otaru
Actors from Kobe
Musicians from Kobe
Japanese male film actors
Japanese male television actors
Deaths from liver cancer
Deaths from cancer in Japan
People from Zushi, Kanagawa
Shintaro Ishihara
20th-century Japanese male actors
Keio University alumni
20th-century Japanese male singers
20th-century Japanese singers